Susan Hogan (born 1948) is a Canadian film, television and stage actress.

Background
Born and raised in Scarborough, Ontario, she chose to pursue acting as a career after being cast as Abigail in her high school production of The Crucible. She attended the National Theatre School of Canada beginning in 1966. After graduating, she began appearing in theatre productions in Toronto and at the Stratford Festival, although due to her blonde, green-eyed beauty she became typecast in ingenue roles until breaking through to wider notice as Stas in a 1978 production of Pam Gems's play Dusa, Fish, Stas and Vi.

Career
In 1979, The Globe and Mail theatre critic Bryan Johnson named Hogan one of the year's best actresses for her performance in John Murrell's Waiting for the Parade.

In 1981, she injured her knee during a preview performance as Kate in a production of The Taming of the Shrew. Although forced to withdraw from a handful of performances, she was able to return to the role.

In 1983, Hogan and her husband Michael Hogan starred together in the CBC Television miniseries Vanderberg as Hank Vanderberg, a Calgary oil magnate, and his wife Elizabeth. In 1991, Hogan appeared in Cynthia Grant and Svetlana Zylin's Djuna: What of the Night with Company of Sirens in Toronto, Ontario.

In 1985, although Gabrielle Lazure physically portrayed the role of Pauline Shapiro in Joshua Then and Now, Hogan overdubbed her voice due to Lazure's lingering Québécois accent. In the same year, she began appearing as Nicole in the drama series Night Heat.

Other roles around this time included Rolling Vengeance, the television film Easy Prey and a guest appearance in Street Legal, while her stage roles included a First Nations spirit in Linda Griffiths's Jessica, Marjorie in a production of William Mastrosimone's Extremities, and as Matilda, opposite her husband as Zastrozzi, in George F. Walker's Zastrozzi, The Master of Discipline. However, two weeks into the run of Extremities, she was forced to withdraw from the role after suffering whiplash during the play's opening rape scene, and was replaced by Arlene Mazerolle for the remainder of the show's run.

In 1988, she was a guest co-host of CTV's talk show Lifetime for a week during regular host Liz Grogan's pregnancy leave. Other guest hosts included Maureen McTeer, Dinah Christie and Jayne Eastwood.

In 1989, Hogan appeared in a production of Byron Ayanoglu's Anarchy, was cast in the film Narrow Margin, and filmed an episode of Danger Bay which was planned as a potential backdoor pilot for a new series that would star Hogan as a television journalist and single mother. The series was not picked up.

In 1991, Hogan appeared in her most noted film role, as Marlene in Bordertown Café. In 1993 and 1994, she appeared in the television soap opera Family Passions.

In 1995, she played Regan in a partially gender-reversed production of King Lear, in which Janet Wright played the lead role.

Awards
In 1998, she garnered a Jessie Richardson Theatre Award nomination for her performance as Lonnie in a production of Michael MacLennan's Grace. She was nominated in the same category in 2000 for playing Ruella in Alan Ayckbourn's Communicating Doors. She has also received three Leo Award nominations, for Best Actress in a Film in 1998 for Rupert's Land, Best Actress in a Dramatic Series in 1998 for Dead Man's Gun, and Best Supporting Actress in a Film in 2005 for Marker.

Personal life
Susan and Michael Hogan have three children, including actor Gabriel Hogan.

Selected filmography
A Sweeter Song (1976)
I Miss You, Hugs and Kisses (1978)
The Brood (1979)
Title Shot (1979)
An American Christmas Carol (1979)
Phobia (1980)
Vanderberg (1983)
The Little Vampire (TV series) (1985 - 1987)
Easy Prey (1986 TV movie)
Rolling Vengeance (1987)
Narrow Margin (1990)
White Fang (1991)
Bordertown Café (1992)
Impolite (1992)
No greater love (film)  (1996)
Disturbing Behavior (1998)
Rupert's Land (1998)
The Butterfly Effect 2 (2006)
Everything's Gone Green (2006)
The Color of Rain (2014)
The Christmas Secret (2014)
Hailey Dean Mystery: Murder, With Love (2016)
''Time for Me to Come Home Xmas. (2018)

References

External links

1948 births
Canadian film actresses
Canadian television actresses
Canadian stage actresses
Living people
Actresses from Toronto
National Theatre School of Canada alumni
People from Scarborough, Toronto